Sarah Daninthe (born 25 June 1980 in Les Abymes, Guadeloupe) is a French fencer who competed at the 2004 Summer Olympics in the women's team épée and won a bronze medal.

References

1980 births
Living people
French female épée fencers
Olympic fencers of France
French people of Guadeloupean descent
Fencers at the 2004 Summer Olympics
Olympic bronze medalists for France
Olympic medalists in fencing
Medalists at the 2004 Summer Olympics
21st-century French people